Luis Ángel Calzadilla Santillán (born 14 January 2000) is a Mexican professional footballer who plays as a midfielder for Liga MX club Pachuca.

Career statistics

Club

References

External links
 
 
 

Living people
Association football forwards
Atlético San Luis footballers
C.F. Pachuca players
Liga MX players
Footballers from Hidalgo (state)
2000 births
Mexican footballers